Joe Brennan (born 18 April 1990) is an Irish hurler who currently plays as a substitute centre-forward for the Kilkenny senior team.

Brennan joined the team during the 2012 National League, An All-Ireland medalist in the minor grade, he has won one National League winners' medal as a non-playing member of the senior panel.

At club level 'The Pig' plays with the St Patrick's club.

References

1990 births
Living people
21st-century Irish farmers
Kilkenny inter-county hurlers
St Patrick's (Kilkenny) hurlers